Chimarra ambaja is a species of fingernet caddisfly in the family Philopotamidae. It is found in Africa.

References 

Trichoptera
Insects described in 1939